Lamniconus is a subgenus  of sea snails, marine gastropod mollusks in the family Conidae, the cone snails and their allies.

In the latest classification of the family Conidae by Puillandre N., Duda T.F., Meyer C., Olivera B.M. & Bouchet P. (2015), Lamniconus has become a subgenus of Conus as Conus (Lamniconus) da Motta, 1991 (type species: Conus cleerii  Reeve, 1844) represented as Conus Linnaeus, 1758

Distinguishing characteristics
The Tucker & Tenorio 2009 taxonomy distinguishes Lamniconus from Conus in the following ways:

 Genus Conus sensu stricto Linnaeus, 1758
 Shell characters (living and fossil species)
The basic shell shape is conical to elongated conical, has a deep anal notch on the shoulder, a smooth periostracum and a small operculum. The shoulder of the shell is usually nodulose and the protoconch is usually multispiral. Markings often include the presence of tents except for black or white color variants, with the absence of spiral lines of minute tents and textile bars.
Radular tooth (not known for fossil species)
The radula has an elongated anterior section with serrations and a large exposed terminating cusp, a non-obvious waist, blade is either small or absent and has a short barb, and lacks a basal spur.
Geographical distribution
These species are found in the Indo-Pacific region.
Feeding habits
These species eat other gastropods including cones.

 Subgenus Lamniconus da Motta, 1991
Shell characters (living and fossil species)
The shell is turbinate to elongate conical in shape.  The protoconch is paucispiral.  The spire is scalariform and concave in cross section.  The shell is ornamented with cords and nodules which die out early in the postnuclear whorls.  The anal notch is deep.  The periostracum is tufted, and the operculum is small.
Radular tooth (not known for fossil species)
The anterior section of the radular tooth is roughly equal in length with the posterior section, the blade is long and covers most of the anterior section.  A basal spur is present, and the barb is short.  The radular tooth has serrations, and an internal terminating cusp.
Geographical distribution
The species in this genus occur in the occur in the West Atlantic region.
Feeding habits
These cone snails are presumed to be vermivorous, meaning that the cones prey on polychaete worms, based upon the radular tooth morphology.

Species list
This list of species is based on the information in the World Register of Marine Species (WoRMS) list. Species within the genus Lamniconus include:

 Lamniconus carcellesi (Martins, 1945): synonym of Conus (Lamniconus) carcellesi Martins, 1945 represented as Conus carcellesi Martins, 1945
 Lamniconus clerii (Reeve, 1844) : synonym of  Conus clerii Reeve, 1844
 Lamniconus lemniscatus (Reeve, 1849) : synonym of  Conus lemniscatus Reeve, 1849
 Lamniconus patriceae Petuch & R. F. Myers, 2014: synonym of Conus patriceae (Petuch & R. F. Myers, 2014)
 Lamniconus tostesi (Petuch, 1986): synonym of Conus (Lamniconus) tostesi Petuch, 1986 represented as Conus tostesi Petuch, 1986
 Lamniconus xanthocinctus (Petuch, 1986) : synonym of  Conus xanthocinctus Petuch, 1986

References

Further reading 
 Kohn A. A. (1992). Chronological Taxonomy of Conus, 1758-1840". Smithsonian Institution Press, Washington and London.
 Monteiro A. (ed.) (2007). The Cone Collector 1: 1-28.
 Berschauer D. (2010). Technology and the Fall of the Mono-Generic Family The Cone Collector 15: pp. 51-54
 Puillandre N., Meyer C.P., Bouchet P., and Olivera B.M. (2011), Genetic divergence and geographical variation in the deep-water Conus orbignyi complex (Mollusca: Conoidea)'', Zoologica Scripta 40(4) 350-363.

External links
 To World Register of Marine Species
  Gastropods.com: Conidae setting forth the genera recognized therein.

Conidae
Gastropod subgenera